Sant'Ambrogio is an underground station on Line 2 of the Milan Metro. It was opened on 30 October 1983 as part of the extension of the line from Cadorna to Porta Genova. The station takes the name from nearby Basilica of Saint Ambrose.

The station is located at the intersection of Via Giosuè Carducci and Via San Vittore, in Municipality 1, close to the Catholic University and the Milan National Museum of Science and Technology.

It is one of the stations on Line 2 with no central support columns between the two tracks, similarly to Moscova and Loreto.

The station will serve as a transfer point to the currently under construction Line 4, scheduled to open in 2024, through an open-air passage next to the Saint Ambrose Postern.

References

External links

Line 2 (Milan Metro) stations
Railway stations opened in 1983